Lake View is a hamlet in Erie County, New York, United States. 

Lake View is in the town of Hamburg.

Geography 
 
It is bounded by Eighteen Mile Creek on the south, Pleasant Avenue on the north, Lake Erie on the west and the village of Hamburg on the east.

History  
Early settlers were Ebenezer Ames, Jacob F. Schoellkopf, a successful entrepreneur in western New York, and Ebenezer Walden, a prominent Buffalo attorney and mayor whose family built the Lake View Hotel in 1880 to serve the many traveling salesmen who arrived on the seven daily trains on the Lake Shore and Michigan Southern Railway (later part of New York Central Railroad) to sell their wares in the surrounding countryside. The salesmen (called "drummers") would rent a horse and buggy from the livery stable behind the six-room hotel to make their rounds.

By 1890, two more railroads ran through Lake View - the New York, Chicago and St. Louis Railroad (the Nickel Plate Road) and the Pennsylvania Railroad which brought economic prosperity to the small community. An electric trolley called the Buffalo & Erie was built to facilitate travel to and from Buffalo and operated until the mid-1930s.

In 1882, the Idlewood Association, a summer resort colony in Lake View was founded by Buffalo businessmen where members, including James N. Adam and John D. Larkin, had summer residences.

Also established were the Lake View School in 1890, the Gatling Land Boom in 1893, the Day Bicycle Factory in 1895, and the Lake View Fire Association in 1923. 

During World War II, two young women named Winifred Stadler and Rita Fierle produced a newsletter called the Lake View Local which was sent to the town's men and women serving their country abroad.

In the late 1950s, the Lake View Community Association produced a cookbook called "The ABC's of Cooking" which contained many favorite recipes from the town's residents.

 
Lake View, NY is also the Official home of the 6 time World Champion Moose Jaw Rockies of the Preston Ridlehuber Football League (P.R.F.L.)  The home of Moose Jaw Central sits atop the cliffs overlooking Eighteen Mile Creek.

Religious Institutions 
The Lake View Community Church was established in 1889.

Our Lady of Perpetual Help Roman Catholic Church was established in 1921;   On September 1, 2001, it and the congregation from St. Vincent de Paul Roman Catholic Church were merged and officially renamed Blessed John Paul II Parish. Upon the canonization of John Paul II on April 27, 2014, the parish assumed the name of St. John Paul II R.C. Church.

Notable people
William Stachowski, former New York state senator
Francis J. Pordum, former New York state assemblyman
Ebenezer Walden, former mayor of Buffalo, New York

References

External links
 Lake View Times, web-related resources for Lake View and the surrounding area; includes noteworthy events, local links, old photos, community cookbook from the 1950s, a history of the area, maps and information on prominent citizens.
 Lake View Community Church since 1891
 Emergent Christian Youth of Lake View
 Lake View Community Association since 1922
 Eighteen Mile Creek, a stream that forms the southern border of Lake View and empties into Lake Erie
 More on Eighteen Mile Creek, home to 385-million-year-old Middle Devonian fossils
 History of Lake View, covering 1804 to 1924; written in 1965 by Raymond V. Healy 
 Demographics for ZIP code 14085
 Census of Lake View 1930
 Railroad stations

Hamlets in Erie County, New York